Six ships of the Royal Navy have been named HMS Prince, including:

  was a 100-gun first-rate ship of the line launched in 1670 and renamed HMS Royal William in 1692. Broken up in 1813.
She was renamed HMS Prince in 1705, HMS Princess in 1711 and HMS Princess Royal in 1728. She was broken up in 1773.
She was renamed HMS Prince in 1714. She was rebuilt in 1750, and broken up in 1773.
  was a 98-gun second rate launched in 1788. She was rebuilt in 1796 and was broken up in 1837.
  was a storeship hired in 1854 and lost later that year in the Crimean War.
  was an  launched in 1916 and sold in 1921.

In addition many ships have been named after specific princes, including:
 
 
 
 
 
 
 
 
 
 
 
 
 
  (1610) also known as Royal Prince

See also
 

Royal Navy ship names